Chantal Mantz (born 26 June 1996) is a German table tennis player. Her highest career ITTF ranking was 111.

References

1996 births
Living people
German female table tennis players
21st-century German women